The Fred Lancaster Barn is a historic barn in rural eastern Stone County, Arkansas. It is located in the Round Bottom area northeast of Mountain View. It is a traditional-format four-crib log structure with a tall gable roof. The barn was built in 1918 by Fred Lancaster, and represents a transition from the traditional style crib barn to one with a transverse layout.

The barn was listed on the National Register of Historic Places in 1985.

See also
National Register of Historic Places listings in Stone County, Arkansas

References

Barns on the National Register of Historic Places in Arkansas
Buildings and structures completed in 1918
Buildings and structures in Stone County, Arkansas
National Register of Historic Places in Stone County, Arkansas